Christopher Frederick Hill (born June 1971) is a British businessman. He is CEO of Hargreaves Lansdown, a financial services company which is a constituent of the FTSE 100 Index.

Early life
Hill was educated at Cheltenham College, then earned a degree in modern history from Keble College, Oxford.

Career
Before joining Hargreaves, Hill was employed as chief financial officer (CFO) by Travelex UK Ltd, CFO and executive director by IG Group Holdings Plc, finance director by VWR International LLC, a principal by Arthur Andersen LLP and a principal by General Electric International Operations.

In September 2016, it was announced that Ian Gorham would step down as CEO of Hargreaves Lansdown by September 2017, and would be succeeded by Hill.

Following the Neil Woodford Fund management issues  he issued the following statement in June 2019 'I would like to apologise personally to all clients who have been impacted by the recent problems with the Woodford Equity Income Fund. We all share their disappointment and frustration. Our priority right now is to support our clients and keep them informed.'

References

1971 births
Living people
British chief executives
British corporate directors
People educated at Cheltenham College
Alumni of Keble College, Oxford
General Electric people